Berchem is the debut album of the Belgian rock band Dead Man Ray, released in 1998. The album is named after the town of Berchem, near Antwerp, where the band originates.

Track listing
 All music by Dead Man Ray.
"Beegee" – 5:00
"Inc." – 2:42
"Stain" – 3:10
"Bones" – 3:03
"6"-Pack – 3:43
"Bread" – 4:00
"Moïd" – 5:06
"Perfo" – 4:06
"Chemical" – 4:23
"Horse" – 3:33
"WW3" – 1:59
"Copy Of 78, Part 1" – 3:15
"Copy Of 78, Part 2" – 8:28
"Copy Of 78, Part 3" – 1:04
"Stool" – 2:40
"Babydoll" – 5:15

Dead Man Ray albums
1998 debut albums